Sorceress (also known as Temptress II) is a 1994 American erotic horror film directed by Jim Wynorski. Released direct-to-video on January 4, 1995, it is considered a cult film.

Premise 
An attorney is rising through the ranks at a prominent law firm due to his wife's black magic. But he will have to face a new case involving another sorceress who might make it hard for him.

Cast 
 Larry Poindexter as Larry Barnes
 Julie Strain as Erica Barnes
 Linda Blair as Amelia Reynolds
 Edward Albert as Howard Reynolds
 Michael Parks as Stan Latarga
 Lenny Juliano as Don
 Rochelle Swanson as Carol
 Toni Naples as Maria
 William Marshall as John Geiger
 Antonia Dorian as Trisha
 Kristi Ducati as Kathy
 Melissa Brasselle as Mrs. Annie Latarga
 Fred Olen Ray as Bill Carson

Sorceress II

A sequel followed in 1997.

References

External links 
 
Sorceress II at IMDb
 
 
 

1995 films
1995 horror films
American fantasy films
American supernatural horror films
American independent films
Films directed by Jim Wynorski
Direct-to-video horror films
American erotic horror films
1990s English-language films
1990s American films